Iranian Arabs ( ʿArab Īrān;  Arabhāye Irān) are the Arab inhabitants of Iran who speak Arabic as their native language. In 2008, Iranian Arabs comprised about 1.6 million people, and are primarily located in Khuzestan Province.

Overview
The historian and Iranologist Elton L. Daniel explains that for centuries, Iranian rulers maintained contacts with Arabs outside their borders, dealt with Arab subjects and client states such as those of the Lakhmids and Himyarites, and settled Arab tribesmen in various parts of the Iranian Plateau. The Arab expedition to Iran began before the Muslim conquests and continued with joint exertions of the civilized Arabs (ahl al-madar) and desert Arabs (ahl al-wabar).

According to the Minorities at Risk Project 2001, about 40 percent of Arabs are unskilled workers living in urban areas. The Arabs in the rural areas are primarily farmers and fishermen. The Arabs living along the Persian Gulf coastal plains are mostly pastoral nomads. Tribal loyalties are strong among rural Arabs, but also have an influence in urban areas, impacting Arab socialization and politicization.

History
Shapur II the Great (309–379 A.D.) of the Sasanian Empire, after a punitive expedition across the Persian Gulf early in his reign, transplanted several clans of the Taghleb to Dārzīn (Daharzīn) near Bam, several clans of the Abd al-Qays and Tamīm to Haǰar (the Kūh-e Hazār region) southeast of Kermān, several clans of the Bakr ben Wāʾel to Kermān, and several clans of the Hanzala to Tavvaz, near present-day Dālakī in Fārs.

Although after the Arab conquest of the Sasanian Persian empire in the 7th century, many Arab tribes settled in different parts of Iran, it is the Arab tribes of Khuzestan that have retained their identity in language, culture, and Shia Islam to the present day. But ethno-linguistic characteristics of the region must be studied against the long and turbulent history of the province, with its own local language khuzi, which may have been of Elamite origin and which gradually disappeared in the early medieval period. The immigration of Arab tribes from outside the province was also a long-term process. There was a great influx of Arab-speaking immigrants into the province from the 16th to the 19th century, including the migration of the Banu Kaab and Banu Lam. There were attempts by the Iraqi Hussein regime during the Iran–Iraq War (1980–88) to generate Arab nationalism in the area but without any palpable success.

Genetics
Sampling NRY diversity, it was determined that the Y-DNA haplogroups F and J2 such as haplogroup J1 are carried at high frequency among the Iranian Arabs, accounting for more than half of Iranian Arab haplogroups. The high ratio of haplogroup F genetically relates Iranian Arabs to Eastern Mediterraneans and the people of the Barbary Coast. An elevated frequency of haplogroup J-M172 is typical of Near Eastern people and reflective of the genetic legacy of early agriculturalists in the Neolithic Near East c. 8000–4000 BCE. Haplogroup R1a1, and R1, typical of Indo-Iranian groups, occurred in more than 11 percent of the sample and haplogroup G was present in more than 5 percent. Haplogroup J1-M267 reaches 33.4% in samples from Khuzestan, higher than in other parts of Iran. It also reaches a frequency of 31.6% in Khuzestani Arabs.

Regional groups

Khuzestan

Most Iranian Arabs in Khuzestan Province speak Arabic and Persian. The Arabic spoken in the province is Khuzestani Arabic, a mixture of Gulf Arabic and South Mesopotamian Arabic.

Hamid Ahmadi noted that the Arabs of Khuzestan Province are direct descendants of the ancient population of the area, having adopted the Arabic language and identity with the spread of Islam, although there are numerous immigrant Arab tribes of Khuzestan with origins from the Arabian Peninsula, such as the Banu Ka'b at Dawraq, the later Fallāhīya and present-day Shadegan, the Musha'sha' at Hoveyzeh, Banu Tamim, and more from southern Iraq.

The Bani Turuf tribe is settled in the Dasht e Azadegan (formerly Dasht-e Mīshān) around the town of Hūzagān (formerly Hoveyzeh), and consists of seven tribes, the Sovārī, Marzaā, Shorfa, Banī Sāleh, Marvān, Qāṭeʿ, and Sayyed Nemat. North of the lands of the ʿAnāfeja of the Āl Katīr, in the area called Mīānāb, between the Kārūn and Karkheh Rivers, dwell several Arab tribes, of which the best known are the Kaab (probably an offshoot of the Banī Kaʿb of southern Khuzestan), the ʿAbd al khānī, the Mazraa, the Al Bū Rāwīya, and the Sādāt. These tribes gradually immigrated into Iran during and after the early years of the Qajar period.

Culture of Iranian Arabs in Khuzestan

Strong blood relation which is one of the peculiarities of Arab society, results in cooperation between Arabs in hardships as well as the intensification of internecines between tribes.
Iranian Arabs are well known for hospitality too.

Iranian Arab Women's costumes
Women's scarves have various types including Aba that is a black Chador with long sleeves from which hands are only exposed from wrist. Another is called Asabe or a turban like scarf, and the quality of the used cloth denotes the social rank of the woman. Pooshie is a mask-like silk cloth that covers the face. Dresses are of different types too. Nefnef is a long loose dress and Thoub is a gauzy loose dress that is worn on the Nefnef. Ne'al and Kabkab or Karkab are two kinds of footwear.

Fars

Khamseh Arab nomads live in eastern Fars Province (From Lar and close surrounding areas to Khorrambid and Bavanat). Arabs that live in eastern Fars Province and Hormozgan mostly belong to the tribes of Banu Tamim, Banu Kaab and Banu Hammed.

Khorasan

Khorasani Arabs are descended from Arab migrants from Arabia. Most Khorasani-Arabs belong to the tribes of Sheybani, Zangooyi, Mishmast, Khozaima and Azdi. According to a 2013 article in peer-reviewed journal Iran and the Caucasus, the Khorasani Arabs, numbering , are "already almost totally Persianised". Only a very few speak Arabic as their mother tongue. Khorasani-Arabs in the cities Birjand, Mashhad and Nishapur are a small ethnic group but most are Persianized.

Demographics
Elton Daniel in The History of Iran (Greenwood Press, 2001), states that the Arabs of Iran "are concentrated in the province of Khuzistan and number about half a million". The Historical Dictionary of Iran puts the number at 1 million. Iranian Arabs form 1-2% of Iran's population.

See also
List of Iranian Arabs
Lakhmids
Alavids
Iraqis in Iran
Lebanese people in Iran
Moaved
Shia Muslims in the Arab world
Abyssinian–Persian wars
Arab diaspora

References

External links

 About Spoken Arabic of Khoramshahr

Arabs
Arab diaspora in Asia
Semitic-speaking peoples
 
Khuzestan Province
Ethnic groups in the Middle East